Zipp!, One Hundred Musicals for Less Than the Price of One, is a musical revue conceived by Gyles Brandreth and Stewart Nicholls. It opened in the West End's Duchess Theatre on February 4, 2003, following previews from January 24. It closed on April 19, 2003.

The show whizzes through a century of Broadway and West End musicals, including the complete works of Andrew Lloyd Webber in 60 seconds.

References

2003 musicals
West End musicals